Milaisis Duanys Céspedes (born November 18, 1979 in Santiago de Cuba) is a women's basketball player from Cuba. Playing as a forward she won the gold medal with the Cuba women's national basketball team at the 2003 Pan American Games in the Dominican Republic. Her first name is sometimes also spelled as Milaisy.

References
Profile

1979 births
Living people
Cuban women's basketball players
Sportspeople from Santiago de Cuba
Basketball players at the 2003 Pan American Games
Pan American Games gold medalists for Cuba
Small forwards
Power forwards (basketball)
Pan American Games medalists in basketball
Medalists at the 2003 Pan American Games